Lim f (EP) is Swedish progressive metal band Means End first self-produced extended play (EP) featuring songs that would later appear on their debut album, The Didact, in a more refined and mastered state. The song "Lost in Thought" appears on The Didact under a different name, "Mourning Star". The EP was originally released August 31, 2011 with a remixed release on April 17, 2012.

Track listing

Personnel
Robert Luciani –  lead vocals
Rasmus Hemse –  bass
Christian Schreil –  drums
Leonard Östlund –  guitar

References

External links 
 Means End Official Website

2012 debut EPs
Means End albums